Aegean cats ( gáta tou Aigaíou) are a naturally occurring landrace of domestic cat originating from the Cycladic Islands of Greece and western Turkey. It is considered a natural cat, developing without human interference. Development of the Aegean cat as a formal breed began in the early 1990s by breeders in the fledgling Greek cat fancy, but the variety has yet to be recognized by any major fancier and breeder organization. It is considered to be the only native Greek variety of cat.

History
The Aegean cat, as its name suggests, originates from the Cycladic Islands in the Aegean Sea, where they occur as a natural landrace. Aegeans are considered one of the oldest domesticated cat breeds, cats having been introduced to the islands during the Bronze Age. They are common as feral cats in Greece and Turkey, where they are found amongst fishing ports asking for food offerings. In Greece, Aegean cats are considered a national treasure. Feral Aegean cats are notable predators of Aegean wall lizards in the Cyclades.

Aegean cats as pets

Although the Aegean has only very recently begun to be bred systematically, it has been domesticated for many centuries and thus has become adapted very well to humans. It is a social pet that tolerates living in an apartment rather well. It is intelligent, active, lively and also communicative, not hesitating to draw a person's attention.

Aegean cat characteristics
Aegean cats are a medium-sized, muscular, semi-longhaired cat. The coat is bicolour or tricolour with one of the colours being almost always white. White usually takes up between 1/4 to 9/10 of the body. The colour of their coat might include many other colours and patterns. Their paws are medium in size and have a round shape. Their tail can be long and "hooked". The ears have a wide base and rounded tips and are covered by hair. The eyes have an almond shape and their color can be any shade of green, blue and yellow.

Aegean cats are noted for their affinity for water and fishing. Because the breed was allowed to develop through natural selection, rather than selective breeding, Aegean cats are free from most feline genetic diseases.

References

Cat landraces
Cat breeds originating in Greece
Cyclades
Cat breeds